Hellinsia paraglochinias is a moth of the family Pterophoridae. It is found in Ecuador and Peru.

Adults are on wing in April, August and December.

References

Moths described in 1996
paraglochinias
Pterophoridae of South America
Fauna of Ecuador
Moths of South America